William Henry Adams (1809 – 29 August 1865) was a British politician (Conservative Party), lawyer and colonial judge.  His final appointment was as Chief Justice of Hong Kong.

Early life
Adams was born in 1809 and was the son of Thomas Adams of Norman Cross, Huntingdonshire. While still a boy he entered a printing office as a compositor.  He read law in his spare time and in 1843 was called to the bar of the Middle Temple.  He also worked as a law reporter for the Morning Herald.

Political career
Adams was elected unopposed at the 1857 general election as one of the two members of parliament (MPs) for Boston in Lincolnshire, having contested the seat unsuccessfully at the 1852 general election and at a by-election in 1856. He was re-elected unopposed in February 1859 at a by-election following his appointment as Recorder of Derby, but did not stand again at the general election in April 1859.

Legal career
His first judicial appointment was as Recorder of Derby in 1858 while still a member of Parliament.

In 1859, Adams was appointed Attorney General of Hong Kong.   Immediately on his arrival in Hong Kong in September 1859, Adams was appointed acting Chief Justice to replace John Walter Hulme who had returned to England on sick leave.   In his first appearance on the bench "the general consensus of opinion seems to have been one of confidence in his firmness and ability."  In August 1860, Hulme retired on a pension and Adams was appointed Chief Justice.

Death
Adams fell ill in 1865 and died, at the age of 56, at the home of his son Captain Adams in Wales on 29 August 1865.  Adams had been well liked in Hong Kong and a local paper carried the following eulogy:

"It is almost too painful for us to speak of his many estimable qualities, at a time when admiration ought properly give way to grief.  There cannot be two opinions as to the ability with which he discharged the duties of his office.   A juster more conscientious and abler man never sat upon the Bench in this Colony.  Every one must admit that his judgements were delivered with care and with admirable wisdom.  He was one of best men that ever came to China or left it."

References

External links
 

1809 births
1865 deaths
Conservative Party (UK) MPs for English constituencies
UK MPs 1857–1859
British Hong Kong judges
Chief Justices of the Supreme Court of Hong Kong
Attorneys General of Hong Kong
British migrants to British Hong Kong